Rubén Cordano Justiniano (born 16 October 1998) is a Bolivian professional footballer who plays as a goalkeeper for Bolívar and the Bolivia national team.

International career
Cordano made his senior debut for the Bolivia national football team in a 1-0 friendly loss to South Korea on 22 March 2019.

References

External links
 
 

1998 births
Living people
Bolivian footballers
Association football goalkeepers
Bolivian Primera División players
Club Bolívar players
Bolivia international footballers